The National Highway 95, also known as the N-95 or the Chakdara-Kalam Highway, is one of the National Highways of Pakistan, running from the town of Chakdara in Lower Dir District to the town of Kalam in Swat District via Mingora, Manglawar, Charbagh, Khwazakhela, Madyan, and Bahrain in the Khyber Pakhtunkhwa province of Pakistan. 

Its total length is 135 km, and it is maintained and operated by the National Highway Authority.

See also

References

External links
 National Highway Authority

Roads in Pakistan